Naples is a 1898 silent documentary short shot of Naples by the Lumière Brothers. The film played and important role for the history of Neapolitan cinema, being one of the first if not the first shot at Naples on video, while also being one of the first films shot by the Lumière Brothers.

Plot 
The film is made up of various shots taken in via Marina, via Toledo, at the port with a view of Vesuvius and finally in Borgo Santa Lucia.

References

External links 

 Naples, on Internet Movie Database, IMDb.com.

Films shot in Naples
French black-and-white films
1898 films
French short documentary films
French silent short films
Films directed by Auguste and Louis Lumière
1890s French films
1890s short documentary films